The 1991–92 Rugby Football League season was the 97th  season of professional rugby league football in Britain. Fourteen teams competed from August, 1991 until May, 1992 for the Stones Bitter Championship, Premiership Trophy and Silk Cut Challenge Cup.

At the end of the season, players from several clubs were selected to go on the 1992 Great Britain Lions tour of Australia and New Zealand.

Season summary
Stones Bitter League Champions: Wigan
Silk Cut Challenge Cup Winners: Wigan  (28-12 v Castleford)
Stones Bitter Premiership Trophy Winners: Wigan (48-16 v St. Helens)
Harry Sunderland Trophy: Andy Platt
Regal Trophy Winners: Widnes (24-0 v Leeds)
Yorkshire Cup winners: Castleford
2nd Division Champions: Sheffield Eagles

The 1992 Man of Steel Award for player of the season went to Wigan's Dean Bell.

St. Helens beat Rochdale Hornets 24–14 to win the Lancashire County Cup, and Castleford beat Bradford Northern 28–6 to win the Yorkshire County Cup.

League Tables

For the third consecutive season Wigan finished top of the pile, relegated were Swinton and Featherstone Rovers. To date this is Swinton's last appearance in the top flight and more trouble would follow after this relegation their ground Station Road was sold following mis-management. The club are still without a permanent home within the town's boundaries.

Championship final Standings

Second Division Final Standings

Third Division Final Standings

Challenge Cup

Wigan defeated Castleford 28-12 in Challenge Cup Final at Wembley Stadium before a crowd of 77,286. Their winger Martin Offiah was awarded the Lance Todd Trophy for his man-of-the-match performance.

League Cup

Premiership

References

Sources
1991–92 Rugby Football League season at rlhalloffame.org.uk
1991–92 Rugby Football League season at wigan.rlfans.com
Great Britain Competitions 1991-1992 at hunterlink.net.au

1992 in English rugby league
1991 in English rugby league
Rugby Football League seasons